Muhammad Kashif Javed (born 14 August 1982) is a field hockey player from Pakistan. He also took part in the 2010 Commonwealth Games in New Delhi, India.

See also
Pakistan national field hockey team

References

External links
 

Pakistani male field hockey players
Field hockey players at the 2010 Commonwealth Games
Living people
Olympic field hockey players of Pakistan
Field hockey players at the 2008 Summer Olympics
1982 births
Commonwealth Games competitors for Pakistan
21st-century Pakistani people